C-fos-induced growth factor (FIGF) (or vascular endothelial growth factor D, VEGF-D) is a vascular endothelial growth factor that in humans is encoded by the FIGF gene.

Function 

The protein encoded by this gene is a member of the platelet-derived growth factor/vascular endothelial growth factor (PDGF/VEGF) family and is active in angiogenesis, lymphangiogenesis, and endothelial cell growth. This secreted protein undergoes a complex proteolytic maturation, generating multiple processed forms that bind and activate VEGFR-2 and VEGFR-3 receptors. The structure and function of this protein is similar to those of vascular endothelial growth factor C.

Tumor metastasis to lymph nodes 

Lymph node metastasis is very often associated with several types of human malignancies. Cancer cells’ journey to lymph node takes place largely through lymphatic tunnel located in and around of primary tumor. VEGF-D's interactions with VEGFR-3 predominantly expressed in lymphatic vessels plays a key role in restructuring lymphatic channel and, hence, able to alter its functions related to fluid and cell transport along the conduits. VEGF-D has been established to be over-expressed in both tumor tissues and patients’ serum samples in several types of human cancer. In addition, VEGF-D expression has been implicated with increased incidence of regional lymph node metastasis. In experimental mice study, genetically modified tumor cell that was forced to produce VEGF-D protein have been established to boost up regional lymph nodes metastases.

References

External links

Further reading 

 
 
 
 
 
 
 
 
 
 
 
 
 
 
 
 
 
 

Growth factors
Genes associated with cancer